is a former Japanese football player. He played for Japan national team.

Club career
Yoshida was born in Kariya on March 8, 1962. After graduating from Kariya Industrial High School, he joined Japan Soccer League side Yamaha Motors (later Júbilo Iwata) in 1980. The club won 1982 Emperor's Cup and 1987–88 Japan Soccer League. He never moved to any other club and retired as an Iwata player after the 1995 season. He played total 275 league matches and scored 35 goals for club.

National team career
Yoshida was capped 35 times and scored 2 goals for the Japanese national team between 1988 and 1993. He made his international debut in a friendly against China on June 2, 1988 at Nagoya Mizuho Athletics Stadium. He scored his first international goal against China on May 13, 1989 at Okayama Stadium. He was a member of the Japan team that won the 1992 Asian Cup. He played twice in the tournament.

Coaching career
After retirement, Yoshida started coaching career at Júbilo Iwata in 2001. He mainly served as coach for top team and manager for youth team until 2009.

Club statistics

National team statistics

Honors and awards

Team Honors
 1992 Asian Cup (Champions)

References

External links
 
 Japan National Football Team Database
 

1962 births
Living people
Association football people from Aichi Prefecture
Japanese footballers
Japan international footballers
Japan Soccer League players
J1 League players
Japan Football League (1992–1998) players
Júbilo Iwata players
1992 AFC Asian Cup players
AFC Asian Cup-winning players
Association football midfielders